Majjhantika (also known as Madhyantika) was the Indian Buddhist monk of Varanasi who was deputed by Ashoka to spread Buddhism in the regions of Kashmir and Gandhara.

Early life
Majjhantika was born in Varanasi, Uttar Pradesh. He was tasked by Ashoka to travel from Varanasi to Kashmir and Gandhara and spread Buddhism following the Third Buddhist Council which is held in Pataliputra.

Missionary activity in Kashmir and Gandhara

Pali sources detail that Majjhantika was one of the monks sent by Ashoka to cover the Kashmir and Gandhara region. This is also corroborated by the 7th-century monk, Xuanzang. Xuanzang visited this region he noted that most Buddhists belonged to the Sthavira nikāya school which is also the school that Majjhantika belonged to.

See also
 Gandharan Buddhism
 Buddhism in Kashmir
 Culture of Kashmir
 Kashmir Valley

References

People from Varanasi
Indian Buddhist monks
Indian Buddhists
Indian Buddhist missionaries
Year of birth missing
Year of death missing